Shivthar Ghal, also known as Sundarmath, (Sundarmath means Beautiful Monastery), is a cave, about 34 km from Mahad, near Barasgaon, Maharashtra, India.  Shivthar Ghal is located in Varandha Ghat in the Sahyadris on the Bhor-Mahad road. In monsoons, a waterfall falls in front of the cave.

Samarth Ramdas dictated Dasbodh to Kalyan Swami.  Samarth Ramdas lived here for about 22 years.  It is believed that this is where the first meeting between Maratha king Chatrapati Shivaji Maharaj and Samarth Ramdas took place.

The cave was discovered by Shankarrao Deo of Dhule in 1930. The cave and surrounding area was renovated after Samarth Seva Mandal was formed in 1950. The campus includes the actual cave under the waterfall, Ramdas Swami temple, dining hall and accommodation. Between 12:00 pm and 1:30 pm, the visitors can have the prasad consisting of Moong Dal Khichadi and Shira. Shivthar Ghal Sundarmath Seva Samiti organizes various programs at this location.

Notes

References

 

Raigad district
Caves of Maharashtra